Bossiaea zarae, commonly known as Princess May winged pea, is a species of flowering plant in the pea family Fabaceae and is endemic to the northern Kimberley region of Western Australia. It is an erect shrub with winged stems, winged cladodes, scale-like leaves and yellow, and reddish-brown flowers.

Description

Taxonomy and naming
Bossiaea zarae was first formally described in 2015 by Russell Lindsay Barrett in the journal Nuytsia from specimens collected on Bigge Island in 2008. The specific epithet (zarae) is from "the Arabic and Hebrew name Zara (meaning princess)", referring to the Princess May Ranges where this species was discovered.

Distribution and habitat
Princess May winged pea grows on sandstone ridges and pavements in low shrubland in the Prince Regent National Park and on Bigge Island in the northern Kimberley region of Western Australia.

Conservation status
This bossiaea is listed as "Priority Three" by the Government of Western Australia Department of Biodiversity, Conservation and Attractions, meaning that it is poorly known and known from only a few locations but is not under imminent threat.

References

Mirbelioids
zarae
Rosids of Western Australia
Taxa named by Russell Lindsay Barrett
Plants described in 2015